Happenstance is the second studio album by heavy metal band Fozzy. For the album, the band continue with their spoof that they had spent the last 20 years in Japan being megastars and once they returned to America, they realized that many famous artists have ripped off their songs. The album therefore features covers of songs by bands such as Iron Maiden, Judas Priest, Black Sabbath, W.A.S.P., Scorpions and Accept. However, the album also features five original songs by Fozzy.

Reception

The album had little commercial success as it went on to sell fewer copies than its predecessor. It managed to reach at number 34 on the Independent Albums charts. Allmusic reviewer Bradley Torreano gave the album 3 out of 5 stars and praised the songs "To Kill a Stranger" and "Happenstance".

Singles
"To Kill a Stranger"
"With the Fire"
"Crucify Yourself"
"Happenstance"

Track listing

Charts

Personnel

Musicians

 Chris Jericho (credited as Moongoose McQueen) – lead vocals
 Rich Ward (credited as Duke LaRüe) – guitar, backing vocals
 Frank Fontsere (credited as KK LaFlame) – drums, backing vocals
 Ryan Mallam (credited as The Kidd) – guitar
 Keith Watson (credited as Claude "Watty" Watson) – bass

References

Bibliography

External links
 Official website
 Megaforce Records official website

2002 albums
Fozzy albums
Megaforce Records albums
Covers albums